Pierre Mwana Kasongo (also spelled Muana, 10 October 1938 – 13 January 1986) was a Congolese professional footballer who played for the national team Les Léopards, managed other local teams and played for two Belgian teams. During his time in Belgium he played for the teams Gantoise (1965–67) and Verviétois (1960–65).

References 

1938 births
Belgian Congo people
Democratic Republic of the Congo footballers
Democratic Republic of the Congo expatriate footballers
Democratic Republic of the Congo international footballers
1968 African Cup of Nations players
Africa Cup of Nations-winning players
K.A.A. Gent players
Daring Club Motema Pembe players
Expatriate footballers in Belgium
1986 deaths
R.C.S. Verviétois players
Belgian Pro League players
Democratic Republic of the Congo expatriate sportspeople in Belgium
Association football forwards
Democratic Republic of the Congo football managers